Usulután is a stratovolcano in central El Salvador, rising above the coastal plain between the San Vicente and San Miguel volcanoes, and just east of Taburete volcano.

See also
 List of volcanoes in El Salvador
 List of stratovolcanoes

References 
 

Mountains of El Salvador
Stratovolcanoes of El Salvador
Usulután Department